The Waterford Bridge, formerly designated Bridge L0327 and now Bridge L3275, is a historic steel truss bridge over the Cannon River in Waterford Township, Minnesota, United States.  It was constructed in 1909 and is one of the state's earliest surviving bridges to use rigid rather than pinned connections.  Moreover, it is Minnesota's only known road bridge in which some of the rigid connections are fastened with bolts rather than rivets.

The bridge was listed on the National Register of Historic Places in 2010 for having state-level significance in the theme of engineering.  It was nominated for being a rare surviving example of Minnesota's once-common camelback through truss bridges, and for its early and uniquely transitional rigid connections.

Description
The Waterford bridge is a single-span, eight-panel, camelback through truss.

The Waterford Bridge is one of the few remaining camelback through trusses in Minnesota.  The others that are also listed on the National Register of Historic Places are the Gateway Trail Iron Bridge, the Dodd Ford Bridge, and the Long Meadow Bridge.

History
The Waterford Bridge was constructed in 1909.  It replaced a previous bridge of unknown date which had been there since at least 1896.  The new bridge was designed by Dakota County engineer Charles A. Forbes and built by the Hennepin Bridge Company for $5,000.  At the time most truss bridges were still being constructed with the structural members held together by pins.  The builders of the Waterford Bridge opted for stronger rigid connections, even though this was not yet legally required except for state-funded projects.  Unusually, though, many of these connections were made with bolts, a unique intermediate choice proceeding the transition to fully riveted bridges.

In the early 1980s the bridge was threatened by erosion and local citizens raised $40,000 to effect repairs.  However, in 1991 the bridge was sufficiently deteriorated that it was closed to vehicular traffic and the road rerouted over a new bridge built nearby.  In 2014 the southeast abutment was rebuilt again with a grant from the National Trust for Historic Preservation.  As of January 2014 the historic bridge carries a trail used by pedestrians, ATVs, and snowmobiles.

See also
 List of bridges on the National Register of Historic Places in Minnesota
 National Register of Historic Places listings in Dakota County, Minnesota

References

External links
 Waterford Bridge (Bridge L3275)

1909 establishments in Minnesota
Bridges completed in 1909
Buildings and structures in Dakota County, Minnesota
Former road bridges in Minnesota
National Register of Historic Places in Dakota County, Minnesota
Pedestrian bridges in Minnesota
Road bridges on the National Register of Historic Places in Minnesota
Transportation in Dakota County, Minnesota
Truss bridges in the United States
Steel bridges in the United States